Offaly was a parliamentary constituency represented in Dáil Éireann, the lower house of the Irish parliament or Oireachtas, from 2016 to 2020. The constituency elected three deputies (Teachtaí Dála, commonly known as TDs). The method of election was proportional representation by means of the single transferable vote (PR-STV).

History and boundaries
The Constituency Commission proposed in its 2012 report that at the next general election a new constituency called Offaly be created. The report proposed changes to the constituencies of Ireland so as to reduce the total number of TDs from 166 to 158.

It was established by the Electoral (Amendment) (Dáil Constituencies) Act 2013. The constituency incorporated all of County Offaly from the previous Laois–Offaly constituency, and additionally twenty-four electoral divisions from Tipperary North.

The 2013 Act defined the constituency as:

"The county of Offaly;

and in the county of North Tipperary the electoral divisions of:

Aglishcloghane, Ballingarry, Ballylusky, Borrisokane, Carrig, Cloghjordan, Cloghprior, Clohaskin, Finnoe, Graigue, Kilbarron, Lorrha East, Lorrha West, Mertonhall, Rathcabban, Redwood, Riverstown, Terryglass, Uskane, in the former Rural District of Borrisokane;

Ardcrony, Ballygibbon, Ballymackey, Knigh, Monsea, in the former Rural District of Nenagh".

It was abolished at the 2020 general election, along with the Laois constituency. They were replaced by a re-created Laois–Offaly constituency.

TDs

2016 general election

See also
Dáil constituencies
Politics of the Republic of Ireland
Historic Dáil constituencies
Elections in the Republic of Ireland

References

Dáil constituencies in the Republic of Ireland (historic)
Historic constituencies in County Offaly
2016 establishments in Ireland
Constituencies established in 2016
2020 disestablishments in Ireland
Constituencies disestablished in 2020